Stephen Joseph Graham  (born 3 August 1973) is a British actor. He is best known for playing Andrew "Combo" Gascoigne in the film This Is England (2006) and its television sequels This Is England '86 (2010), This Is England '88 (2011), and This Is England '90 (2015). His other film roles include Tommy in Snatch (2000), Shang in Gangs of New York (2002), Baby Face Nelson in Public Enemies (2009), Anthony "Tony Pro" Provenzano in The Irishman (2019), Scrum in the Pirates of the Caribbean films On Stranger Tides (2011) and Dead Men Tell No Tales (2017), Charlie Cole in Greyhound (2020), and Andy Jones in Boiling Point (2021).

On television, Graham has starred as Det. Supt. Dave Kelly in ITV's 2017 drama Little Boy Blue about the 2007 murder of 11 year old Rhys Jones in Croxteth, Liverpool as he walked home from football training, John Corbett in the fifth series of the BBC One series Line of Duty (2019), Al Capone in the HBO series Boardwalk Empire (2010–2014), Jacob Marley in the BBC/FX miniseries A Christmas Carol (2019), DCI Taff Jones in the ITV miniseries White House Farm (2020), Eric McNally in the BBC drama Time (2021), Tony in Help (2021), and Hayden Stagg in the sixth series of Peaky Blinders (2022).

He is the recipient of number of accolades, including a Screen Actors Guild Award as well as nominations for five British Academy Television Awards and two British Academy Film Awards.

Early life
Graham was born on 3 August 1973 in Kirkby, Lancashire. His father was of half Jamaican and half Swedish descent. He was brought up by his mother, a social worker, and his stepfather, a mechanic who later became a paediatric nurse. He maintained a good relationship with his biological father. He attended Overdale Primary School in Kirkby, where he was encouraged to pursue an acting career at the age of eight by local actor Andrew Schofield, who had seen him perform as Jim Hawkins in a school production of Treasure Island. He then continued his education at Ruffwood Comprehensive and was subsequently introduced to Liverpool's Everyman Theatre at the age of 14, later going on to train at the Rose Bruford College of Theatre & Performance.

Career
Graham has often portrayed characters from different British, Irish and American regions. He has played characters who are Cockney, Welsh, Geordie, Scouse and Scottish, as well as an Irish gang member in 19th-century New York City, a 1930s Chicago bank robber, a New Jersey mobster, a Texan, the short-fused English nationalist "Combo" in This Is England, and a Jamaican gangster in Yardie.

Graham was nominated for an RTS Award for his work in The Street, and for a British Independent Film Award for his work in This Is England. He appeared in the music videos for "I Remember" by Deadmau5 and Kaskade, "Fluorescent Adolescent" and "When the Sun Goes Down" by Arctic Monkeys, "Unlovable" by Babybird (directed by Johnny Depp), and Gazelle's single "Finger on the Trigger". Graham also appeared in the music video "Soul Vampire" by Macclesfield-based neo-psychedelic band The Virginmarys, the music video for "Turn" by Travis, and Kasabian's video "You're in Love with a Psycho". He appeared as an inmate within the open prison system in the music video for Goldie's "I Adore You" in 2017.

In 2011, Graham starred in the BBC Christmas show Lapland. When the series was remade as Being Eileen Graham's role was recast with Dean Andrews. He also appeared on a promotional video for a DLC of the video game Call of Duty: Ghosts, titled "CODnapped".

In 2019, Graham featured as DS John Corbett in series 5 of the BBC drama Line of Duty. In November of that year, Graham was the guest for BBC Radio 4's Desert Island Discs. In January 2020, he appeared in the ITV series White House Farm as Welsh detective "Taff" Jones. Despite his reputation for his ability to adopt different accents, a number of critics criticised his performance and stated that his Welsh accent was inauthentic.

In 2021, Graham starred in Philip Barantini-directed film Boiling Point, alongside Vinette Robinson, Ray Panthaki and Hannah Walters. It is a one-shot film set in a restaurant kitchen, expanded from the 2019 short film of the same name. In October 2022, it was announced that the BBC would produce a sequel series, set months after the feature film, with Graham returning.

Graham was appointed Officer of the Order of the British Empire (OBE) in the 2023 New Year Honours for services to drama.

Personal life
Graham married actress Hannah Walters on 6 June 2008; they had met and started dating while both were training at the Rose Bruford College of Theatre & Performance. They currently reside in Ibstock, Leicestershire, having previously lived in the Beckenham area of London. They have a son and a daughter.

Graham is a supporter of Liverpool FC and has made several appearances on the Sky Sports football show Soccer AM. He has struggled with depression and once tried to hang himself in his early 20s; he survived because "the rope snapped". He is teetotal and has dyslexia, revealing that his wife reads scripts for him and helps him decide whether to accept or decline a role: "She says, 'We're doing this,' and I say, 'OK.' [...] If I can find socially aware, political things that are saying somethingwell, that's where I'm from. It's what I know. So it's where I've tried to keep my base."

Graham's mother died in December 2022.

Filmography

Film

Television

Music videos

Awards and nominations

References

External links
 Stephen Graham at the British Film Institute
 

1973 births
20th-century English male actors
21st-century English male actors
Actors from Kirkby
Alumni of Rose Bruford College
English male film actors
English male television actors
English people of Jamaican descent
English people of Swedish descent
Living people
Male actors from Liverpool
Black British male actors
Actors with dyslexia‎ 
Officers of the Order of the British Empire